Campanulorchis is a genus of orchids. It was considered a synonym of the genus Eria, but eventually it has become an accepted name. It is native to Southeast Asia from Hainan to New Guinea.

Species
Five species are recognized as of May 2014:

Campanulorchis globifera (Rolfe) Brieger in F.R.R.Schlechter - Vietnam
Campanulorchis leiophylla (Lindl.) Y.P.Ng & P.J.Cribb - Borneo, Malaysia, Maluku, Sulawesi, Sumatra
Campanulorchis longipes (Gagnep.) J.Ponert - Vietnam
Campanulorchis pellipes (Rchb.f. ex Hook.f.) Y.P.Ng & P.J.Cribb - Thailand, Borneo, Malaysia, Sumatra 
Campanulorchis pseudoleiophylla (J.J.Wood) J.J.Wood - Borneo, Sulawesi, New Guinea
Campanulorchis thao (Gagnep.) S.C.Chen & J.J.Wood - Vietnam, Hainan

References

 
Podochileae genera